This article describes the electoral history of Ron DeSantis, the 46th and current governor of Florida and a former member of the United States House of Representatives. 

A member of the Republican Party, DeSantis was initially elected to the House in 2012 to represent Florida's 6th congressional district. He retained his seat for three terms before not seeking a fourth to pursue the governorship.

DeSantis won the gubernatorial election in 2018 by a margin of around 32,000 votes against Democratic nominee Andrew Gillum. DeSantis won re-election, facing former Florida governor Charlie Crist in the 2022 Florida gubernatorial election.

US House of Representatives

2012

2014 
In this election, no GOP primary was held and DeSantis won the nomination unopposed.

2016

Governor of Florida

2018

2022 
In this election, DeSantis received the GOP gubernatorial nomination unopposed and no primary election was held.

References 

DeSantis, Ron
Ron DeSantis